Julian Weigl (born 8 September 1995) is a German professional footballer who plays as a defensive midfielder for Bundesliga club Borussia Mönchengladbach, on loan from Benfica. He also represents the Germany national team.

Club career

1860 Munich

Weigl is a youth export from 1860 Munich. He made his 2. Bundesliga debut at 14 February 2014 against Ingolstadt 04. He replaced Yannick Stark after 66 minutes in a 2–0 away defeat. He managed to play 14 league games in his first season with TSV's first team. In the first match of the 2014–15 season against Kaiserslautern. Weigl, being only 18 years old, was named captain. He is therefore the youngest captain in the history of 1860 Munich. After the second match of the season Weigl was fined and suspended to the second squad along with his teammates Vitus Eicher, Daniel Adlung and Yannick Stark. The four players had been out drinking late at night and were overheard talking negatively about the club. Weigl was relieved of the captaincy and succeeded by Christopher Schindler.

Borussia Dortmund
After the 2014–15 season, Weigl transferred to Borussia Dortmund, where he signed a contract until 2019.
Julian Weigl made his official Dortmund debut on Saturday 15 August 2015 in a 4–0 home victory against Borussia Mönchengladbach. He made his Europa League debut a month after, when he came on in the 60th minute as a substitute against FC Krasnodar. Weigl's remarkable play earned him a starting place in Dortmund and  helped them finish 2nd in the Bundesliga and also played regularly as Dortmund went deep into the Europa league, before being knocked out by Liverpool. He scored his first goal for Dortmund which was also his first professional goal against Sporting CP in the UEFA Champions League, scoring the winner from outside the box in the 2–1 win. Weigl signed a new contract with Borussia on 21 December, keeping him at the club until 2021. On 13 May 2017, he suffered a fractured ankle in BVB's 1–1 away draw against FC Augsburg. On 18 May 2017, Weigl underwent a successful surgery on his injury, but would be out for three to four months. He returned to Dortmund's XI on 24 September 2017 in BVB's 6–1 home victory against Borussia Mönchengladbach.

Benfica
On 31 December 2019, Benfica announced an agreement with Dortmund to sign Weigl for €20 million. On 2 January 2020, Weigl arrived in Lisbon, where he completed the required physical examination before getting to know his new stadium, signing a contract through 30 June 2024 and being officially introduced to the supporters of his new club.

Loan to Borussia Mönchengladbach
On 1 September 2022, Borussia Mönchengladbach announced an agreement to sign Weigl on loan from Benfica.

International career
Weigl started to represent Germany at youth levels during the qualification for the 2014 European Under-19 Championship, which was eventually won by Germany. Since August 2014 he is part of the U-20 squad. On 13 October 2014, Weigl scored his first international goal in a 1–1 tie against the Netherlands U20. Weigl made his debut for the German U-21 team on 3 September 2015, in a friendly match against Denmark. Rewarded for a fine debut Bundesliga with a place in Germany's provisional squad for Euro 2016, Weigl became a full international when he came off the bench against Slovakia. The game ended in a disappointing 3–1 defeat, but two days later, Weigl received confirmation that he had made the final cut for the Euros, although he did not play any games.

Career statistics

Club

International

Honours
Borussia Dortmund
DFB-Pokal: 2016–17
 DFL-Supercup: 2019

Individual
Facebook FA Bundesliga Newcomer of the Year: 2016
VDV Newcomer of the Season: 2015–16

References

1995 births
Living people
People from Bad Aibling
Sportspeople from Upper Bavaria
Footballers from Bavaria
German footballers
Association football midfielders
TSV 1860 Munich players
TSV 1860 Munich II players
Borussia Dortmund players
S.L. Benfica footballers
Borussia Mönchengladbach players
Bundesliga players
2. Bundesliga players
Regionalliga players
Primeira Liga players
Germany youth international footballers
Germany under-21 international footballers
Germany international footballers
UEFA Euro 2016 players
German expatriate footballers
Expatriate footballers in Portugal
German expatriate sportspeople in Portugal